The Limerick & District League is an association football league featuring amateur and junior clubs from Limerick city and County Limerick east of the N20. It also includes teams from Charleville, County Cork, (Charleville AFC) and Nenagh, County Tipperary, (Nenagh AFC). The league consists of twelve divisions. Its top division, the Premier League, is a seventh level division in the Republic of Ireland football league system. The season runs from August to May. The league is covered regularly by local newspapers such as the Limerick Leader. Teams from the Limerick & District League compete in the FAI Cup, the FAI Intermediate Cup and the FAI Junior Cup.

2019–20 clubs

References 

1971 establishments in Ireland
7
Association football in County Limerick
Sports leagues established in 1971
Association football leagues in Munster
Association football in Limerick (city)